Several special routes of U.S. Route 52 exist, from North Dakota to South Carolina. In order from northwest to southeast, they are as follows.

Minot business loop

Harvey business loop

U.S. Route 52 Business is a  business route of U.S. Route 52 in Harvey, North Dakota. It runs from U.S. Route 52 in Harvey to U.S. Route 52/North Dakota Highway 3.

Jamestown truck bypass route

Major junctions

Iowa alternate route

U.S. Highway 52 Alternate (US 52 Alt.) existed in northeastern Iowa in the 1960s.  The original pavement on US 52 between Dubuque and Luxemburg was in such poor condition that in 1964, the Iowa State Highway Commission temporarily rerouted US 52. It was rerouted along US 20 and Iowa Highway 136. As a result of this, the alternate route was then established along the old route.  Once comprehensive repairs were made to the roadway by 1968, the mainline designation was restored to the routing.

Ironton business loop

U.S. Route 52 Business is a special business route of U.S. Route 52 in Ironton, Ohio.  U.S. Route 52 Business exits the mainline route at the village of Coal Grove, just south of Ironton then follows the original pre-1962 routing of U.S. 52 through the central business district of Ironton before rejoining the mainline near Hanging Rock.  U.S. 52 mainline was moved to its current alignment in 1962, which is a controlled-access 4-lane highway which bypasses the city itself. The business route was established at that time but was poorly signed for many years until 1999 when an effort to improve signage was completed. Since then it has been sufficiently signed as U.S. Route 52 Business.

Williamson truck route

Welch alternate route

US 52's Welch Alternate route follows the original path of US 52 through town prior to construction of the Welch bypass around 1950. The route follows West Virginia Route 16 along with portions of Virginia Avenue and other streets.

Bluefield truck route

U.S. Route 52 Truck follows US 19 from the edge of downtown Bluefield to US 460, a 4-lane highway which it then follows back to regular US 52. The truck route bypasses several 90-degree turns and a residential neighborhood.

Mount Airy alternate route

U.S. Route 52A was established in 1953, replacing the old mainline US 52 through downtown Mount Airy, via Main Street.  It was renumbered in 1960 as US 52 Business.

Mount Airy business loop

U.S. Route 52 Business was established in 1960, a renumbering of US 52A through downtown Mount Airy, via Main Street, Renfro Street, and Lebanon Street. Between 1963–1967, US 52 Business was split on one-way streets: northbound via Cherry and Renfro Streets, southbound via Main Street. Sometime between 1969–1972, southbound US 52 Business was removed from Main and Cherry Streets, and moved onto an extended Renfro Street.

Pilot Mountain alternate route

U.S. Route 52A was established in 1949, replacing the old mainline US 52 through Pilot Mountain, via Main Street.  It was renumbered in 1960 as US 52 Business.

Pilot Mountain business loop

U.S. Route 52 Business was established in 1960, a renumbering of US 52A through Pilot Mountain, via Main Street.  It was decommissioned in 1964 when the Pilot Mountain Parkway was opened, taking US 52 onto a new alignment west of town.

Albemarle business loop

U.S. Route 52 Business was established in the mid-1990s, it goes through downtown Albemarle, via First Street.

Cheraw truck route

U.S. Route 52 Truck (US 52 Truck) is a  truck route of US 52 that has about half of its path within the city limits of Cheraw. All but the northernmost  of its path is concurrent with US 1 Truck.

Florence truck route

U.S. Route 52 Truck (US 52 Truck) is a  truck route of US 52 that is mostly within the city limits of Florence, South Carolina. It is mostly unsigned. It begins concurrent with US 301 (Freedom Boulevard, which is signed as a US 301 truck route), but branches off on its own.

Florence connector route

U.S. Route 52 Connector (US 52 Conn.) is a  connector route of US 52 that is entirely within the city limits of Florence, South Carolina. It has a one-block-long concurrency with US 76 (West Palmetto Street). The rest of the highway uses Coit Street. It is unsigned.

Darlington business loop

U.S. Route 52 Business (US 52 Bus.) is a  business route of US 52 that has most of its length within the city limits of Darlington. Except for its termini, the only other major intersection is that with SC 34/SC 151 at SC 151's southern terminus.

North Charleston connector route

U.S. Route 52 Connector (US 52 Conn.) is a  connector route of US 52 that has its entire length within the city limits of North Charleston. It is a short freeway that connects Interstate 26 (I-26) and US 52/US 78 (Rivers Avenue). Except for its termini, it has no other major interchanges. It is an unsigned highway.

Charleston spur route

It extends from Broad Street to US 52 (where it is named Meeting Street) along the northeastern side of the peninsula of downtown Charleston. The highway provides access for trucks to shipping terminals of the Port of Charleston on the Charleston peninsula: Union Pier and Columbus Street.

The entire length of the highway is in the city of Charleston.  of the route is named Morrison Drive and the remaining  is named East Bay Street.

One section of the route, Morrison Drive near Jackson Street, will flood regularly during a spring tide. The southern terminus is near the historic wharves of Charleston, including Adgers Wharf, which is now the site of a playground. It is also adjacent to the Old Exchange, or Customs House, of Charleston. The current Customs House that was built around the time of the Civil War is on this route.

The section named Morrison Drive was constructed in the early 1950s. It was named for William McG. Morrison, mayor of Charleston from 1953 to 1954.

When Morrison Drive was constructed, there was still one private terminal operating near the southern terminus, the Clydeline Steamship Company. The Clydeline terminal burned down in 1955. In the late 1980s, the land of the terminal was rebuilt as Waterfront Park.

References

External links

52
52
52
 
52
52
52
S52